Making Tracks was a 1981 musical play with words by Alan Ayckbourn and music by Paul Todd. It is set in a recording studio and is about Stan, a recording studio owner in debt to businessman Wolfe, who stakes everything on singer/songwriter Sandy, whilst using the voice of Lace, who is Stan's ex-wife and Wolfe's new partner.

Although the musical enjoyed good ticket sales, critical reaction was lukewarm. The play has been only re-staged a few times, was never published, and is not available for production.

References

 Making Tracks on official Ayckbourn site
 Allen, Paul (2004) A Pocket Guide to Alan Ayckbourn Plays Faber & Faber 

Plays by Alan Ayckbourn
1981 plays
1981 musicals